Sportclub Telstar Vrouwenvoetbal Noord-Holland is a Dutch women's football club based in Velsen. It is connected to SC Telstar.

Its home stadium was the 3,625 seater BUKO Stadion and its home colours were white.

The women's team was established in 2011 and played in the top level Eredivisie and BeNe League. After the 2016–17 season the team relocated to Alkmaar and formed VV Alkmaar. In February 2022 media reported Telstar would restart in the Eredivisie the following season.

Results Eredivisie / BeNe League

Head coaches 
  Hans de Winter (2011–2012)
  Toon Beijer (2012–2013)
  Gideon Dijks (2013–)
  Marelle Worm (2022–)

Current squad

Former players

Former internationals 
 Dyanne Bito
 Loes Geurts
 Stefanie van der Gragt
 Claudia van den Heiligenberg
 Daphne Koster
 Desiree van Lunteren
 Brittany Persaud
 Kristina Šundov
 Mairav Shamir

References

External links 
 Soccerway team profile

BeNe League teams
Telstar
Association football clubs established in 2011
Telstar
2011 establishments in the Netherlands
SC Telstar
Football clubs in Velsen
2017 disestablishments in the Netherlands
Association football clubs disestablished in 2017